Events from the year 1773 in Sweden

Incumbents
 Monarch – Gustav III

Events
 January 18 – The first opera performance in the Swedish language, Thetis et Pelée, performed by Carl Stenborg and Elisabeth Olin in Bollhuset, marks the establishment of the Royal Swedish Opera.
 August – Inauguration of the pleasure gardens Vauxhall (Gotheburg).
 The Royal Swedish Ballet is founded.
 The title Hovsångare is created by King Gustav III of Sweden, with the first recipients being Elisabeth Olin and Carl Stenborg.
 The Royal Swedish Academy of Arts is formally organized. Fifteen artists are accepted as members the same year, among them being Lorens Pasch the Younger and Ulrika Pasch.  
 A theater designed by Carl Fredrik Adelcrantz is constructed for the royal court at Gripsholm Castle.
 The population death rate doubles, due to famine and dysentery caused by crop failures in the previous years.
 Mobilization of the army in the province of Finland because of a feared attack from the Empire of Russia.
 De nymodiga fruntimren by Catharina Ahlgren.

Births

 9 December - Marianne Ehrenström, culture personality and multiple artist, member of the Royal Swedish Academy of Music (died 1867)
 - Inga Åberg, opera singer and stage actress (died 1837)

Deaths

 - Beata Sabina Straas, actress (born unknown date)

References

 
Years of the 18th century in Sweden
Sweden